Chanathip Songkrasin (born 5 November 1993), also known as Jay, is a Thai professional footballer who plays as an attacking midfielder for J1 League club Kawasaki Frontale and the Thailand national team.

Club career

BEC Tero Sasana

Chanathip was promoted to the BEC Tero Sasana first team squad by new coach Andrew Ord who had also been his youth team coach. His first senior team goal came on 6 May, in a match against Thai Port in the Thai League 1, which gave BEC Tero Sasana a 2–0 win. In early 2013 Chanathip had an offer from J.League side Gamba Osaka. At the end of the season, he won the TPL Young Player of the Year.

In mid-October Shimizu S-Pulse of the J.League offered him a trial at the end of the 2013 season. In late October it was reported directly from BEC Tero Sasana's general manager Robert Procureur that Bundesliga club Hamburg would give Chanathip a trial at the end of the 2014 Bundesliga season and if he succeeded he would be the second Thai player to play in the Bundesliga after Witthaya Laohakul.

Muangthong United
On 27 January 2016, it was announced that Chanathip, along with his BEC Tero teammates Peerapat Notchaiya and Tanaboon Kesarat, would be joining Muangthong United on loan for the 2016 season. Chanathip netted his first goal for Muangthong United on 1 May 2016 when he scored from Tristan Do's cross in the 18th minute, in what turned out to be the only goal in a victory over Chonburi. Chanathip later permanently joined Muangthong United for an undisclosed fee. He helped his club to win the 2016 Thai League and 2016 Thai League Cup in his first season.

Chanathip Songkrasin produced a strong performance in the 2017 AFC Champions League group stage in the first two games against Brisbane Roar and Kashima Antlers, from which Muangthong United managed to collect four points. He was named man of the match for both games.

Hokkaido Consadole Sapporo
In December 2016, it was announced that Chanathip would be joining the newly promoted J.League side Hokkaido Consadole Sapporo in the summer of 2017 on loan from Muangthong United, lasting for a season and a half. Chanathip was officially presented by Consadole Sapporo on 11 January 2017. This loan followed Chanathip's impressive performances during the 2016 AFF Championship in addition to being scouted by Consadole Sapporo previously. Chanathip played the first half of the 2017 season with his parent club, Muangthong United, before heading to Sapporo, Japan, in July 2017.

On 26 July 2017, Chanathip made his debut for Consadole Sapporo in 2017 J.League Cup against Cerezo Osaka as a substitute replacing Ryota Hayasaka in the 46th minute. On 29 July 2017, he was part of the starting lineup in a J1 League match against Urawa Red Diamonds, his first ever league appearance. Besides, he became the first Thai footballer appearing in the top tier of Japan's professional football league system (Previously, other Thais only appeared in Japanese football semi-professional top tier or professional lower tiers.). His first J-League goal came through a header in a 3–3 draw at Cerezo Osaka on 2 March 2018.

On 13 July 2018, Chanathip signed a contract with Consadole Sapporo, making him a permanent Hokkaido Consadole Sapporo player until 1 February 2019.

On 3 December 2018, after leading Consadole Sapporo to a record high fourth-place finish in 2018 J1 League, Chanathip was voted by his teammates as the team's most valuable player of the season. After that, he was announced as one of the players in J.League team of the season, being the first ever Southeast Asian to do so.

Kawasaki Frontale

In January 2022, Chanathip joined Kawasaki Frontale with a transfer fee of around $3.8 million, breaking the J.League record for the highest domestic transfer.

In March 2022, Chanathip booked his first assist in a match against Nagoya Grampus.

International career

Chanathip Songkrasin started his international stage with Thailand national under-20 football team, he played latest in 2012 AFC U-19 Championship.

In the top level, Chanathip was first called up by Thailand national team head coach Winfried Schäfer to compete in the 2012 King's Cup, and debuted in this tournament. He continued to be called to 2012 AFF Suzuki Cup squad. At 19 years old, he was the youngest player who called by Winfried Schäfer.

In February 2013 he scored his first goal for the first team against Kuwait in the 2015 AFC Asian Cup qualification which ended up 1-3 lost against Kuwait. After that game, he scored another goal in a friendly match against China.

He represented Thailand U23 in the 2013 Southeast Asian Games. Chanathip played for Thailand U23 in the 2014 Asian Games.

In 2014, Chanathip was a part of Thailand's winning squad for the 2014 AFF Suzuki Cup. During the tournament Chanathip scored the first goal in the 3–0 win over the Philippines in the semi-finals and assisted second goal for Kroekrit Thaweekarn in a 2–0 victory over Malaysia in the first leg of the final. He also scored the last goal in the second leg to cement Thailand's place on the trophy. Afterwards he was named best player of the tournament and became the youngest AFF Suzuki Cup MVP at the age of 21.

In May 2015, he was called up by Thailand to play in the 2018 FIFA World Cup qualification (AFC) against Vietnam. The same year, Chanathip won the 2015 Southeast Asian Games with Thailand U23.

In December 2016, Chanathip again led Thailand to the title of 2016 AFF Championship, the fifth title of his nation. He was also awarded another Most Valuable Player and became the first player to win it twice.

He was named into the Thai squad participating in the 2019 AFC Asian Cup. After an unpromising performance against India in the first match, where he silenced as Thailand suffered a 1–4 shock loss, he returned to prominence, scoring one goal as Thailand overcame Bahrain and holding host UAE to reach the round of sixteen for the first time since 1972 competition.

In December 2021, Chanathip was named captain for Thailand in the 2020 AFF Championship, winning the championship for the sixth time for his nation. He was also named the Most Valuable Player (MVP) for the tournament, winning it for the third time.

Style of play
Chanathip usually plays in the position of attacking midfielder who provides the chance for his front line. He is known for his pace, agility, and dribbles that can handle 1-3 opponents while in possession and can play both feet. Chanathip also has the special threat of powerful and accurate shots from outside the box. Gongphop Songkrasin, Chanathip's father, and his first trainer later revealed that he was supposed to train his son with the style of his idol Diego Maradona.

Career statistics

Club

International

International goals
Scores and results list Thailand's goal tally first.

Honours
BEC Tero Sasana
Thai League Cup: 2014

Muangthong United
Thai League 1: 2016
Thai League Cup: 2016
Thailand Champions Cup: 2017

Thailand U-19
AFF U-19 Youth Championship: 2011

Thailand U-23
Sea Games: 2013, 2015

Thailand
AFF Championship: 2014, 2016, 2020
King's Cup: 2016

Individual
Thai Premier League Young player of the Year: 2012
AFF Championship Best eleven: 2016 
ASEAN Football Federation Best XI: 2017AFF Championship Most Valuable Player: 2014, 2016, 2020
AFF Men's Player of the Year: 2015, 2017
FA Thailand President Award: 2017
FA Thailand Men's Player of the Year: 2018
Consadole Sapporo Most Valuable Player: 2018
Sapporo Dome Most Valuable Player: 2018
J.League Best XI: 2018
AFF Championship Top Scorer: 2020Orders'''
 Silver Medalist (Seventh Class) of The Most Admirable Order of the Direkgunabhorn: 2015

References

External links
 
 Profile at Goal
 
 

1993 births
Living people
Chanathip Songkrasin
Chanathip Songkrasin
Association football midfielders
Chanathip Songkrasin
Chanathip Songkrasin
Chanathip Songkrasin
Chanathip Songkrasin
Chanathip Songkrasin
Japan Soccer League players
Expatriate footballers in Japan
Thai expatriate sportspeople in Japan
J1 League players
Footballers at the 2014 Asian Games
Kawasaki Frontale players
Hokkaido Consadole Sapporo players
Thai expatriate footballers
Chanathip Songkrasin
Chanathip Songkrasin
Southeast Asian Games medalists in football
2019 AFC Asian Cup players
Competitors at the 2013 Southeast Asian Games
Competitors at the 2015 Southeast Asian Games
Chanathip Songkrasin